Hans-Erik Pedersen (born 10 December 1943) is a Danish boxer. He competed in the men's welterweight event at the 1964 Summer Olympics. At the 1964 Summer Olympics, he defeated Boniface Hie Toh of the Ivory Coast, before losing to Issake Dabore of Niger.

References

External links
 

1943 births
Living people
Danish male boxers
Olympic boxers of Denmark
Boxers at the 1964 Summer Olympics
Welterweight boxers
People from Vejle Municipality
Sportspeople from the Region of Southern Denmark